Breck's Mill Area, also known as Breck's Mill Area-Henry Clay Village Historic District, is a national historic district located along Brandywine Creek in unincorporated  New Castle County, Delaware, near Wilmington. It encompasses 56 contributing buildings, five contributing sites, and three contributing structures. The district encompasses The Mill, The Workers' houses, and The Mill Owner's Home.

Breck's Mill was built in 1813 and rebuilt in 1846 after a fire.  It is a three-story, stone structure measuring 55 feet by 43 feet.  It features a stone bell tower with a top floor of brick.  The Henry Clay Village area includes small single or double workers' houses, the Charles I. du Pont house (1823), Ernest du Pont house (1916), William F. Raskob house , Hagee's Tavern, Greenhill Presbyterian Church, and the original building for the Alexis I. duPont High School (1893).

"Rokeby" was built in 1836, and is a two-story, rectangular dwelling in a late Federal style.  It measures 55 feet wide and 26 feet, 4 inches, deep, and features a two-story portico overlooking the Brandywine.  It was built by mill owner William Breck for his new wife Gabrielle du Pont and is thought to be modeled on Louviers.  The mill closed in 1854.  It has been a recreational center off and on since 1890. Breck's Mill houses the post office for Montchanin, Delaware, Somerville Manning Gallery, and André Harvey's sculpture studio.

It was added to the National Register of Historic Places in 1971 and amended in 1988.

References

External links
Collection of DuPont Company powder yards on the Brandywine Creek photographs at Hagley Museum and Library. The collection includes images of Breck's Mill and Henry Clay Village.

Du Pont family residences
Federal architecture in Delaware
Historic districts in Delaware
Grinding mills in Delaware
Historic districts on the National Register of Historic Places in Delaware
National Register of Historic Places in Delaware
Grinding mills on the National Register of Historic Places in Delaware